is a Japanese football player.

Club statistics
Updated to 23 February 2019.

References

External links
Profile at Kawasaki Frontale

1986 births
Living people
Kokushikan University alumni
Association football people from Kyoto Prefecture
Japanese footballers
J1 League players
J2 League players
Sagan Tosu players
Yokohama FC players
Kawasaki Frontale players
Ventforet Kofu players
Renofa Yamaguchi FC players
Association football midfielders
Association football fullbacks